Sejal Shah is an Indian cinematographer. He has worked on a number of Bollywood films and advertisements.

Career

Shah has done more than 250 commercials, including for major brands such as  Indian Oil, Sprite, Royal Stag, Hyundai, Ford Endeavour, Black Berry, Honda, and Nokia. His debut feature, Silence Please... The Dressing Room was based on match fixing,  Missed call   Which played in many Film Festivals.

Filmography

As cinematographer
 Kaali Khuhi (2020)
 Solo - One Episode - (Tamil / Malayalam, 2017)
 War Chod Na Yaar - (Hindi, 2013) 
 Commando: A One Man Army - (Hindi, 2013) 
 Bodyguard - (Hindi, 2011)
 Action Replayy - (Hindi, 2010)
 Ramaa: The Saviour - (2010)
 London Dreams - (Hindi, 2009)
 Missed Call    - (2005) 
 Silence Please... The Dressing Room - (2004)

Awards and nominations
 Nominated - 5th  Apsara Film & Television Producers Guild Awards         for Best Cinematography (2009) - London Dreams

References

External links
 
 on YouTube

Hindi film cinematographers
Living people
Cinematographers from Maharashtra
Year of birth missing (living people)